The Battle of Mir took place on 9 and 10 July 1812 during Napoleon's invasion of Russia. Three Polish Lancers divisions battled against Russian cavalry, ending in the first major Russian victory in the war.

Battle
Russian general Matvei Platov had eight Cossack regiments and two Don batteries deployed south of the village of Mir, when one brigade of the Polish Fourth Light Cavalry attacked his advance posts, numbering about 100 men. These advance posts had the dual job of both observation and sentry duty, and to entice the enemy to attack; ambushes of a hundred men each were set up farther down the road to Mir, on either side of it. The Polish general Alexander Rosniecki's forces clashed with Russian Alexander Vasilchikov's cavalry, resulting in hand-to-hand combat with fairly even losses.  Followed by Uhlans, they swept through the village, attacking Platov's main force. A third Polish brigade attempting to join the fight was encircled and broken by Cossacks, after which the entire Polish force gave ground, driven back with the aid of Russian Hussars. After the arrival of Vasilchikov's Akhtyrka Hussars, Dragoons, and other reinforcements, the battle raged for six hours, shifting to the nearby village of Simiakovo. Platov defeated the enemy there, and moved on to Mir, where he inflicted further losses on the enemy before tactically withdrawing. A complete rout was only averted by Tyszkiewicz's brigade, which covered the Polish retreat.

Aftermath
The town of Mir and fort ruins were used as a headquarters by Jérôme Bonaparte, until he decided on the 16th to leave the army, after quarrels with Vandamme, Davout and with his older brother. After retreating, the Mir Castle was destroyed with gunpowder.

See also
List of battles of the French invasion of Russia

Notes

References

External links
 

Battles of the French invasion of Russia
Battles of the Napoleonic Wars
Battles involving Russia
1812 in the Russian Empire
1812 in Belarus
July 1812 events
Military history of Belarus
Mir, Belarus
Minsk Governorate